Zona B is a Serbian blues rock band from Belgrade.

History
Former Idoli bassist Zdenko Kolar and drummer Dušan Ristić "Rista" officially formed Zona B on November 29, 1986. After several personnel changes, the band got a default lineup featuring  Jovan "Lole" Savić (vocals), Dušan "Duda" Bezuha (a former Suncokret member, guitar), Tomislav "Toma" Rakijaš (guitar) and Vladimir "Buca" Filipović (keyboards). The band performed cover versions of blues classics by B.B. King, Muddy Waters, J.J. Cale, and became one of the most notable club bands in Belgrade.

In 1991 the band released their debut album called Bestseller featuring cover versions of blues classics and produced by Bezuha. The album featured covers of Willie Dixon's "Spoonful", Fleetwood Mac's "Oh Well", J.J. Cale's "Cocaine)", The Nashville Teens' "Tobacco Road", and others. The album was released through PGP-RTB. Guest appearances on the album featured Bebi Dol on vocals and Petar "Pera Joe" Miladinović on harmonica.

The next release was Juke-Box which, beside cover versions, featured two Zona B songs written by Bezuha and Savić, "My Woman" and "Don't Put Me Down". The album was produced by Bezuha and was released by PGP-RTS. As guests on the album appeared Saša Lokner (Hammond organ), Svetozar "Zoran" Božinović (guitar, vocals), Petar "Pera Joe" Miladinović (harmonica), Miroslav "Cvele" Cvetković (bass, vocals), Ivan Božinović "DJ. Ike" (vocals). After the album release, Savić, Rakijaš and Filipović left the band. Their replacements were Petar "Pera" Zarija (vocals), Svetozar "Zoran" Božinović (a former Pop Mašina and Rok Mašina member, guitar and vocals) and Ljuba Đordević (harmonica). The new lineup performed Božinović's song "Negde daleko" which was originally recorded by Pop Mašina. The cover appeared on the Blues Summit Coupe Vol. 1 various artists compilation.

In 1999, the band released the album, Pirat through Round Records. Guest appearances featured Vlada Divljan (guitar), Ognjan "Ogi" Radivojević (Hammond organ), Petar "Pera" Radmilović (drums), Miroslav "Cvele" Cvetković (vocals), Ivana Ćosić (vocals). After the album release, Đordević left the band and guitarist Dragan "Dadi" Stojanović joined the band. In 2000, the first two LPs were rereleased on CD on the Two on One compilation.

In 2005 after a five-year discography pause, the band released the album Original with fifteen Zona B songs written by Slobodan "Boca" Samardžić, Miomir "Muki" Mušicki and Dragan "Dadi" Stojanović. The album was released through One Records and produced by Duda Bezuha, like all the previous releases. Guest appearances featured the band's first vocalist, Jovan "Lole" Savić and Petar "Pera Joe" Miladinović on harmonica. In 2004, Božinović died, and Zona B continued their activity as a five-piece.

In 2007, the band released the album, Devil Blues. The album was released by One Records and produced by Bezuha. In 2007, appeared Zdravo-živo - Aleksinac 11.08.2006. (Howdy - Aleksinac August 11, 2006), an official bootleg recording of the band's 2006 appearance in Aleksinac.

In 2010, the band recorded the song "The Joker", dedicating it to Serbian tennis player Novak Djokovic. In 2011, the band celebrated 25 years of existence with a concert with the blues band Point Blank, held in Gun club in Belgrade. During the same year, the band released the album Joker, featuring 15 songs, with music written by Bezuha, and the lyrics written by Mušicki. The album featured numerous guests: Vasil Hadžimanov, Ognjen Radivojević, Tanja Jovićević, Miroslav Cvetković "Cvele", and others. In 2014, the band released the DVD Crna maca (Black Kitty), originally recorded in 1997 in Crna maca club in Belgrade, to be broadcast on the Radio Television of Serbia. The DVD was promoted with a concert in Belgrade Youth Center, featuring Tanja Jovićević, Dragoljub Crnčević, Jovan Ilić, Petar "Pera Joe" Miladinović, Rade Radivojević and Lole Savić as guests.

Discography

Studio albums
 Bestseller (1991)
 Juke-Box (1993)
 Pirat (1999)
 Original (2005)
 Devil Blues (2007)
 Joker (2011)
Songmaker (2020)

Live albums
 Zdravo-živo - Aleksinac 11.08.2006. (Official bootleg, 2007)

Compilation albums
 Two on One (2000)

Video albums
Crna maca (2014)

Various artists compilations
 Belgrade The Blues Today Vol. 1 (1994)
 Blues Summit Coupe Vol. 1 (2000)
 Blues Summit Coupe Vol. 2 (2000)

References

EX YU ROCK enciklopedija 1960-2006, Janjatović Petar;

External links
 Official site
 Official myspace
 Zona B at Youtube

Serbian blues rock musical groups
Yugoslav rock music groups
Musical groups from Belgrade
Musical groups established in 1987